Santeau is a commune in the Loiret department in north-central France.

See also
Communes of the Loiret department

References

External links
 
 Annuaire-Mairie.fr Santeau 

Communes of Loiret
Loiret communes articles needing translation from French Wikipedia